SLP adaptor and CSK interacting membrane protein is a protein that in humans is encoded by the SCIMP gene.

Function

This gene encodes a transmembrane adaptor protein that is expressed in antigen-presenting cells and is localized in the immunologic synapse. The encoded protein is involved in major histocompatibility complex class II signal transduction and immune synapse formation. Alternatively spliced transcript variants have been found for this gene. [provided by RefSeq, Dec 2012].

References

Further reading